Sumlut Gun Maw is an officer of the Kachin Independence Army who currently serving as the vice chief-of-staff with the rank of brigadier general since 2009.

He became one of the youngest leaders of the Kachin Independence Organization (KIO) after launching several innovative programs. Aside from his many years as a frontline soldier for the Kachin Independence Army, he holds several key positions within the KIO, such as head of the National Information Services (NIS) and was a key negotiator for the peace talks with the government of Myanmar. He has been very active in improving and reforming the education system of the KIO.

After attending a reconciliation conference in 2004, where he played golf in Yangon, he founded the Laiza Golf Club. In 2009 he was appointed as the vice chief-of-staff with the rank of brigadier general.

In 2013, he attended peace talks in Myitkyina where he was hailed by thousands of Kachins as the KIA's representative.  The talks resulted in a lessening of hostilities but not a complete ceasefire.

In 2017, he was the vice-chairman of the KIO and attended the Union Peace Conference - 21st Century Panglong in Naypyidaw as a member of the United Nationalities Federal Council.

References

Brigadier generals
People from Kachin State
Living people
Year of birth missing (living people)